Cellino & Barnes was an American personal injury law firm based in Buffalo, New York. It was founded in 1998 by Ross Cellino, Jr. and Stephen Barnes, and dissolved in 2020 shortly before the death of Stephen Barnes. It traced its history back to a firm founded by Cellino's father, Cellino & Likoudis, in 1958. They were well known nationally for their distinctive jingle, which became an internet meme. The firm had offices across New York State, including New York City, and also in Los Angeles. In 2017, Cellino & Barnes had 50 attorneys and 250 employees in their offices.

Upon dissolution of the firm in June 2020, the two attorneys formed separate agencies: Cellino Law and The Barnes Firm.

On October 2, 2020, Barnes, along with his niece Elizabeth, were killed in the crash of a TBM 700 single-engine private airplane in Pembroke, Genesee County, New York.  He was 61 years old. Upon his death, Barnes' brother Rich Barnes took over as the head and face of The Barnes Firm.

References 

Law firms established in 1998
Defunct law firms of the United States
Companies based in Buffalo, New York
1998 establishments in New York (state)
Law firms disestablished in 2020
2020 disestablishments in New York (state)
Law firms based in New York (state)